"This Strange Effect" is a song written by Ray Davies of The Kinks, and released first by Dave Berry in July 1965. The single was released in the United States in September 1965. It reached No.1 in the Netherlands, but peaked at No.37 on the UK Singles Chart.

A studio recording was never officially released by The Kinks, but live recordings exist. An in-studio BBC recording by the Kinks from August 1965 was released in 2001 on BBC Sessions 1964-1977.

Bill Wyman covered the track for his 1992 album Stuff. This version can also be found on A Stone Alone: The Solo Anthology 1974-2002.

Belgian band, Hooverphonic, covered the song in 1998 for their album, Blue Wonder Power Milk. Their version of "This Strange Effect" was released as a single and was featured in the American television advertisement for the Motorola SLVR.

Another cover was recorded in 2006 by Finnish band The Others, aka 22PP, for their album Monochromeset.

A version of the song also appears on the 1999 Thievery Corporation compilation album, Abductions and Reconstructions.

Squeeze covered the song on the deluxe edition of their 2015 album, ''Cradle to the Grave.

In 2009, Northern Irish pop punk/new wave band, The Undertones covered "This Strange Effect" for Onder Invloed, a project by Dutch journalist Matthijs van der Ven, which showcases various musicians from all over the world covering their favourite songs.

Steve Wynn also covered the track.

In 2017, Apple began running television advertising for the iPhone featuring the cover version of this song performed by The Shacks.

A cover version performed by Unloved appeared in the third series of Killing Eve.

References

1965 singles
1998 singles
Dave Berry (musician) songs
The Kinks songs
Dutch Top 40 number-one singles
Songs written by Ray Davies
Hooverphonic songs
1965 songs
Song recordings produced by Mike Smith (British record producer)